Vinyl flooring may refer to:

 Sheet vinyl flooring
 Vinyl composition tile